John Adams Howell (March 16, 1840 – January 10, 1918) was a rear admiral of the United States Navy, who served during the Civil War and the Spanish–American War. He was also a noted inventor.

Biography
Howell was born in Bath, New York, on March 16, 1840 to William and Adelphia Frances Howell. He had four brothers; Edward Augustus Howell, William Howell, Jr. and twin brothers Robert and William Adams that died before their first birthdays. He graduated from the United States Naval Academy in 1858, and was promoted to lieutenant in April 1861. He married Arabelle E. Krause on May 11, 1867, and they had three children: William, Arabella, and Frances.

During the American Civil War, Howell served as executive officer of the steam sloop  at the Battle of Mobile Bay on August 5, 1864, and was honorably mentioned by his commanding officer in his despatches.

Howell was promoted to lieutenant-commander in March 1865, and commander on March 6, 1872.

Howell was an Assistant in the U.S. Coast Survey, and the commanding officer of the Coast Survey steamer A. D. Bache in the early 1870s. The "Howell Basin", in the Atlantic Ocean, east of Cape Cod, and the "Howell Hook", a submerged reef off the coast of southern Florida, are named in his honor.

Howell was promoted to captain on March 1, 1884, and in 1887 was a member of the Naval Advisory Board. He was promoted to rear admiral in 1898. During the Spanish–American War he commanded a division of the North Atlantic Squadron.

Rear Admiral Howell died in Warrenton, Virginia on January 10, 1918.

Inventions
Howell is remembered less for his wartime achievements than for his innovations in ordnance. He invented the self-steering torpedo—the "Howell torpedo"—and also patented torpedo launchers, gyroscopes for the guidance of torpedoes, explosive shells, a disappearing gun carriage for shore defense emplacement, and an amphibious lifeboat.

References

Further reading
 The Encyclopedia of the Spanish-American and Philippine-American Wars, p. 293.

External links
 

1840 births
1918 deaths
Union Navy officers
19th-century American inventors
United States Naval Academy alumni
United States Navy admirals
People from Bath, New York